The XVII Reserve Corps / XVII RK was a corps level command of the German Army in World War I.

History 
The Corps was formed in October 1914 as the temporary Corps Graudenz or Corps Zastrow named for its commander General der Infanterie Ernst von Zastrow, military governor of Graudenz.  On 21 July 1915 it was established as XVII Reserve Corps.  The Corps was dissolved on 17 September 1917.

The nucleus of the corps was troops collected at Graudenz Fortress.  In mid-November 1914 it consisted of two divisions: Wernitz and Breugel with a strength of 26 battalions, 6 squadrons and 13 batteries.

On February 8, 1915 Zastrow Korps was organized as follows:

Commanders 
Corps Zastrow / XVII Reserve Corps had the following commanders during its existence:

See also 

XVII Corps (German Empire)

References

Bibliography 
 
 
 
 

Corps of Germany in World War I
Military units and formations established in 1914
Military units and formations disestablished in 1917